= Santa Rosa Science and Technology High School =

Public high school in Laguna, Philippines

- (SRSTHS)

Location
- Region IV-A (CALABARZON); Santa Rosa, Laguna; Philippines; 14°18′59″N 121°06′41″E

Information
- Type: Non-Sectarian; Co-educational; and Public Science.
- Established: 2002
- Grades: 7 to 12
- Colours: Blue, Red, Yellow, and White
- Nickname: Sci-Tech (col. Saytek), StaRSci
- Newspaper: Pararayos, The Satellite

The Santa Rosa Science and Technology High School is a non-sectarian, co-educational secondary public science and technology high school located in J.P Rizal Blvd. Barangay Market Area, Santa Rosa City, Laguna, 4026, in the Philippines.

== History ==
President Gloria Macapagal-Arroyo signed into law the Republic Act 9083, creating the Santa Rosa Science and Technology High School on April 8, 2001. Cong. Uliran T. Joaquin of the First District of Laguna was its principal author.

The law was implemented in the school year 2002-2003 through the initiative and financial support of the local government of Santa Rosa led by Mayor Leon C. Arcillas.

== Admissions ==
=== Application Policies for Junior High School ===
1. Applicant student must belong to the upper 20% of the graduating class, and has grades at least 85% in subjects such as Mathematics, Science, and English as of 2nd quarter Grade VI, certified by the Principal.
2. Average score in Santa Rosa Science and Technology High School Entrance Examinations or STENEX for Junior High is at least 85% or above in three phases of assessment, namely:
- Proficiency Examination on Mathematics, Science and English
- Mental ability/aptitude Examination
- Interview

== Curriculum ==
Santa Rosa Science and Technology High School founded Science, Technology and Engineering (STE) Curriculum with STEM (Science, Technology, Engineering and Mathematics) Program. It is focused on pure science and its applications to industry using the latest technologies. Computer rooms are to be linked to the internet, including multi-media classrooms. Instruction shall be supplemented with visits to known science institutions, laboratories & plants. The school shall maintain a well-stock library, and to subscribe to professional, scientific and technological magazines and manuals.

=== Grade 7 ===
- Filipino 7: Ibong Adarna
- English 7: Philippine Literature
- Science 7
  - Biology 7
  - Physics 7
  - Chemistry 7
  - Earth and Space 7
- Mathematics 7
- Araling Panlipunan: Kasaysayan ng Asya
- MAPEH 7
- Edukasyon sa Pagpapakatao

==== Specialized Subjects ====
- Computer 7
  - Introduction to Word Processors: MS Word
  - Introduction to Spreadsheet Programs: MS Excel
  - Introduction to Presentation Programs: MS PowerPoint
- Research 7

=== Grade 8 ===
- Filipino 8: Florante at Laura
- English 8: Asian and African Literature
- Science 8
  - Physics 8
  - Earth Science 8
  - Chemistry 8
  - Biology 8
- Mathematics 8
- Araling Panlipunan 8: Kasaysayang Pandaigdig
- MAPEH 8
- Edukasyon sa Pagpapakatao 8

==== Specialized Subjects ====
- Computer 8
  - Basics of Computer Hardware Servicing
  - Introduction to Image Manipulation: Adobe Photoshop
  - Introduction to Desktop Publishing: MS Publisher
  - Introduction to Web Design/HTML: Notepad+
- Research 8
  - Applied Research
  - Life Research
- Math Investigatory 8

=== Grade 9 ===
- Filipino 9: Noli me Tangere
- English 9: Anglo-American Literature
- Science 9
  - Biology 9
  - Chemistry 9
  - Physics 9
  - Earth and Space 9
- Enhanced Mathematics 9
- Araling Panlipunan 9: Economics
- MAPEH 9
- Edukasyon Sa Pagpapakatao 9

==== Specialized Subjects ====
- Research 9
  - Applied Research
  - Life Research
- Electronics
- Computer 9
- Trigonometry 9
- Biotechnology 9

=== Grade 10 ===
- Filipino 10: El Filibusterismo
- English 10: World Literature
- Science 10
  - Earth Science 10
  - Physics 10
  - Biology 10
  - Chemistry 10
- Organic Chemistry
- Mathematics 10
- Araling Panilipunan 10: Kontemporaryong Isyu
- MAPEH 10
- Edukasyon sa Pagpapakatao 10

==== Specialized Subjects ====
- Electronics and Robotics
- Research 10
  - Applied Research
  - Life Research

== Grade Maintenance and Promotion Policies ==
=== Standard Grades ===
==== Junior High ====
- No failing grade in any subject for the school year.
- 85% or above grade in Mathematics, Science, English, and Research.
- 83% or above grade in other subjects.

==== Senior High ====
- No failing grade in any subject in any semester.

NOTE: Proper behavioral decorum and attitude is also a must.
